The 2002 season was the Atlanta Falcons' 37th in the National Football League (NFL) and their first in the newly formed NFC South. It was also the team's first season under new owner Arthur Blank, who acquired the team during the 2002 offseason. The team improved upon their previous season's output of 7–9 and qualified for the playoffs for the first time since 1998. The team was also involved in a rare tie, matching the Pittsburgh Steelers 34–34 at the end of overtime.

Before the season, the Falcons acquired running back Warrick Dunn to help with the team’s running game. Their running game had suffered the past three years. Dunn finished the season with 927 rushing yards and 9 total touchdowns. With the boost of Dunn, the Falcons rushed for 2,368 yards (148 yards per game) and 23 touchdowns, both the fourth-best in the NFL. 

After seeing limited action as a rookie, this was Michael Vick's first full season as starting quarterback.

In the Wild Card Game, Vick and the Falcons defeated the Brett Favre-led Green Bay Packers at Lambeau Field, 27–7, giving the Packers their first ever playoff loss in Lambeau. However, a 20–6 loss to Donovan McNabb and the Philadelphia Eagles in the next round kept the Falcons from advancing in the playoffs. 

This was Dan Reeves' last full season as head coach as he was replaced by interim Wade Phillips during the following season.

Vick and linebacker Keith Brooking were voted to play in the Pro Bowl after the season. However, neither Vick not Brooking actually participated in the game. The Pro Bowl was Vick's first and Brooking's second. It was the final season the Falcons used their traditional black falcon helmet logo.

The last remaining active member of the 2002 Atlanta Falcons was quarterback Michael Vick, who played his final NFL game in the 2015 season, although he missed the 2006 and 2007 seasons.

Offseason

NFL Draft

Undrafted free agents

Personnel

Staff

Roster

Regular season

Schedule
In addition to their NFC South rivals, the Falcons played all teams from the NFC North and AFC North. In addition, the Falcons played the New York Giants from the NFC East, and the Seattle Seahawks from the NFC West, based on  standings.

Game summaries

Week 1: at Green Bay Packers

Week 2: vs. Chicago Bears

Week 3: vs. Cincinnati Bengals

Week 13: at Minnesota Vikings

Week 16: vs. Detroit Lions

Playoffs

Schedule

Game Summaries

NFC Wild Card: at Green Bay Packers

Standings

References

Atlanta Falcons seasons
Atlanta Falcons
Atlanta Falcons